Anjana Singh is an Indian actress. She mainly works in Bhojpuri films and television serials. She made her on-screen debut with Ek Aur Faulad (2012) and her Bhojpuri television debut was Bhag Na Bache Koi.

Filmography
Her latest video Radhe Radhe track on trading on the occasion of Lord Krishna Janmashtami.

Awards and nominations

See also
 List of Bhojpuri cinema actresses

References

External links

Living people
Indian film actresses
Actresses from Lucknow
Indian television actresses
Actresses in Bhojpuri cinema
21st-century Indian actresses
1990 births